Eric Crompton (11 May 1913 – 6 March 1988) was  a former Australian rules footballer who played with Footscray in the Victorian Football League (VFL).

Notes

External links 
		

1913 births
1988 deaths
Australian rules footballers from Victoria (Australia)
Western Bulldogs players
Ballarat Football Club players